KNGF (channel 27) is a sports-formatted independent television station licensed to Grand Forks, North Dakota, United States, serving the Fargo–Grand Forks television market. The station is owned by BEK Sports Network, Inc., a subsidiary of BEK Communications Cooperative. KNGF's transmitter is located on the KVLY-TV mast near Blanchard, North Dakota.

History
Channel 27 in Grand Forks was formerly occupied by KCPM, whose license was canceled on March 9, 2020, for failure to transmit from authorized facilities for the past 12 months. The frequency was put up for auction on June 7, 2022, along with 26 other full-power TV licenses. BEK Sports Network, Inc. was awarded channel 27 with a $6,411,000 winning bid.

BEK was formally granted a construction permit for the new station on July 25, 2022. KNGF filed for a license to cover on February 9, 2023, which usually indicates that a station has signed on the air. 

Prior to KNGF's launch, BEK programming was seen on KRDK-TV (channel 4) during the afternoon and evening hours.

Subchannels
The station's digital signal is multiplexed:

References

Television channels and stations established in 2023
Television stations in North Dakota
2023 establishments in the United States
Independent television stations in the United States
NewsNet affiliates